Darren Oxbrow (born 1 September 1969) is an English former professional footballer who played for Maidstone United, Colchester United and Barnet.

References

1969 births
Living people
Sportspeople from Ipswich
Association football defenders
English footballers
Ipswich Town F.C. players
Maidstone United F.C. (1897) players
Colchester United F.C. players
Barnet F.C. players
Kettering Town F.C. players
English Football League players